The Protestant School Board of Greater St Martin was a Protestant Christian school district in Quebec, Canada. It operated schools in Chomedey in Greater Montreal. The board was established in 1958.

References

Historical school districts in Quebec
1958 establishments in Canada
Educational institutions established in 1958